Mode setting is a software operation that activates a display mode (screen resolution, color depth, and refresh rate) for a computer's display controller by using VESA BIOS Extensions or UEFI Graphics extensions (on more modern computers).

The display mode is set by the kernel. In user-space mode-setting (UMS), the display mode is set by a user-space process.

Kernel mode-setting is more flexible and allows displaying of an error in the case of a fatal system error in the kernel, even when using a user-space display server.

User-space mode setting would require superuser privileges for direct hardware access, so kernel-based mode setting shuns such requirement for the user-space graphics server.

Implementation

Microsoft Windows 
Microsoft Windows versions that are NT-based use kernel mode setting. The kernel error display made possible by kernel mode setting is officially called "bug check", but more commonly known as the Blue Screen of Death.

Linux 

 

The Linux kernel got the prerequisite for kernel-based mode setting by accepting Intel GEM in version 2.6.28, released in December 2008. This will be replaced by Tungstens Graphics TTM (Translation Table Maps) memory manager which supports the GEM API. TTM was developed for the free and open-source drivers for Radeon and S3 Graphics graphic chipsets (see Free and open-source graphics device driver). Support for Intel GMA graphic chipsets was accepted in version 2.6.29, released on March 23, 2009. Support for pre-R600 ATI Radeon graphics cards was accepted in version 2.6.31, released on September 9, 2009. Support for R600 and R700 was in development within DRM and was merged in version 2.6.32. Support for Evergreen (R800) was merged in version 2.6.34. As Nvidia did not release all the needed documentation for its graphics chip, development proceeded under the nouveau project, which uses reverse engineering to build a working open-source driver for Nvidia cards. Nouveau was accepted in version 2.6.33 of the kernel, released on December 10, 2009. Kernel-based mode setting is not only supported by the nouveau driver, it is required. Wayland compositors (e.g. Weston) and kmscon depend on kernel mode setting via ioctl.

FreeBSD 
FreeBSD has support for both kernel-based mode setting and GEM for later generations of Intel GPUs (IronLake, SandyBridge, and IvyBridge) starting with version 9.1.

NetBSD 
NetBSD has support for kernel-based mode setting and accelerated graphics for Intel and Radeon devices. This implementation was introduced in version 7.0 by porting the Linux 3.15 DRM/KMS code.

OpenBSD 
OpenBSD has kernel-based mode setting support for Intel and Radeon GPUs. Starting with version 5.4 of OpenBSD, support for Intel GPUs is available. With the release of version 5.5, the implementation has been extended to add support for Radeon chipsets as well.

Alternatives 

The following alternatives have been presented during the Linux Plumbers Conference 2013:
 It was suggested to split GEM and KMS.
 Atomic Display Framework, by Google's Android-Team.
 Common Display Framework.

See also 
 Screens of death

References

External links 
 Mode Setting on the X.org wiki
 Intel Graphics Driver on the X.org wiki
 ATI Radeon driver on the X.org wiki
 Kernel Mode Setting on the Fedora project wiki

Device drivers
Graphics hardware
Operating system technology